John J. DeBerry Jr. (born February 5, 1951) is an American politician who served as a Democratic member of the Tennessee House of Representatives, representing District 90 from 1995 to 2021. After his defeat in 2020, Governor Bill Lee appointed him to become his senior advisor.

Education
DeBerry graduated from Freed–Hardeman University and the University of Memphis.

Career

Democratic Party removal from ballot 
In May 2020, the Tennessee Democratic Party’s State Executive Committee voted 41 to 18 to remove DeBerry from the Democratic primary ballot after 26 years in office. One of the committee members who voted to remove him said that DeBerry wasn’t “exemplifying the basic Democratic principles.“ DeBerry himself protested that it hadn't been the voters in his district that had taken him off the ballot rather, "A tribunal took me off the ballot that has absolutely nothing to do with my district."

2020 protests 
On August 1, 2020, DeBerry, as a Tennessee State Representative, delivered remarks on the floor of the Tennessee State Legislature during a debate with lawmakers on a law to increase penalties for demonstrators suspected of certain violent offences against police officers. During the debate, DeBerry gave a speech that had a large impact on social media. In the speech, DeBerry argued that the protests going on in the U.S at the time would be more successful if they remained peaceful.

He spoke about rioters and demonstrators in Portland, Seattle and elsewhere in the U.S. and the negative impacts of them due to the destruction, violence, and property damage caused across the country. He argued that people did not have the right to destroy taxpayer-funded property. He recalled that his family had participated in civil rights activism in the mid-twentieth century and he personally witnessed the civil rights protests of the time. He also remembered that in his early life, he had to walk into public places through back doors, sit in the back of buses, drink out of the "colored" water fountain, and attend a racially segregated school because the law forced him to. He argued that the civil rights movement overcame these things because it had integrity and class, worked peacefully and had common sense and strong values.

Later career
On November 30, 2020, Tennessee Governor Bill Lee announced that DeBerry would serve as a special advisor in his administration. He assumed office on December 1, 2020.

Elections
1994 DeBerry was initially elected in the 1994 Democratic Primary and November 8, 1994 General election.
1996 DeBerry was unopposed for both the 1996 Democratic Primary and the November 5, 1996 General election.
1998 DeBerry was challenged in the August 6, 1998 Democratic Primary, winning with 2,886 votes (91.1%), and won the November 3, 1998 General election with 4,785 votes (86.9%) against Independent candidate Laverne Crockett.
2000 DeBerry was unopposed for both the August 3, 2000 Democratic Primary, winning with 1,691 votes, and the November 7, 2000 General election, winning with 8,329 votes.
2002 DeBerry was unopposed for both the August 1, 2002 Democratic Primary, winning with 6,719 votes, and the November 5, 2002 General election, winning with 10,245 votes.
2004 DeBerry was unopposed for both the August 5, 2004 Democratic Primary, winning with 3,053 votes, and the November 2, 2004 General election, winning with 16,514 votes.
2006 DeBerry was unopposed for both the August 3, 2006 Democratic Primary, winning with 5,791 votes, and the November 7, 2006 General election, winning with 11,881 votes.
2008 DeBerry was unopposed for both the August 7, 2008 Democratic Primary, winning with 4,900 votes, and the November 4, 2008 General election, winning with 15,577 votes.
2010 DeBerry was unopposed for both the August 5, 2010 Democratic Primary, and the November 2, 2010 General election, winning with 8,543 votes.
2012 DeBerry was challenged in the three-way August 2, 2012 Democratic Primary, winning with 4,084 votes (59.7%), and was unopposed for the November 6, 2012 General election, winning with 18,100 votes.
2020 DeBerry was removed from the ballot for the August 2020 Democratic Primaries because of his history of aligning with the Republicans in votes and donations, and is running in the general election as an independent. In the general election against Democrat Torrey Harris, Deberry won 22.7% of the vote.

References

External links
Official page at the Tennessee General Assembly
Campaign site

John DeBerry, Jr. at Ballotpedia

Place of birth missing (living people)
1951 births
Living people
21st-century American politicians
African-American state legislators in Tennessee
Freed–Hardeman University alumni
Democratic Party members of the Tennessee House of Representatives
Politicians from Memphis, Tennessee
University of Memphis alumni
20th-century American politicians
20th-century African-American politicians
African-American men in politics
21st-century African-American politicians